Mankatha is a 2011 Indian Tamil-language action crime film written and directed by Venkat Prabhu. It stars Ajith Kumar in his 50th film, along with an ensemble cast including Arjun Sarja, Trisha Krishnan, Lakshmi Rai, Anjali, Andrea Jeremiah, Vaibhav Reddy, Premji Amaren, and Mahat Raghavendra . It was produced by Dhayanidhi Alagiri's Cloud Nine Movies while Yuvan Shankar Raja composed the musical score and soundtrack, with Sakthi Saravanan working as the cinematographer and the duo Praveen K. L. and N. B. Srikanth as editors. The story, set in Mumbai, revolves around a heist of cricket betting money, executed by a gang of four thieves, who are joined by a fifth unknown man, and its aftermath.

The film was formally launched in August 2010, with its principal photography beginning on 25 October 2010. Filming was held for more than eight months and took place primarily across Chennai, the Dharavi slum in Mumbai and Bangkok, Thailand. Following speculations regarding the film's release, Sun Pictures acquired the theatrical rights and distributed the film via Raadhika's Radaan Mediaworks. Mankatha released on 31 August 2011 worldwide to generally positive reviews and grossed the second biggest opening of all time after Enthiran at the time of release.

Plot 
Vinayak Mahadevan, an ACP of Maharashtra Police, is suspended for having saved Faizal, a smuggler; from encounter killing and helping him escape. Later, a police officer commits suicide because of the leakage of his IPL gambling plans, who is revealed to be Kamal Ekambaram. ACP Prithviraj takes charge to end the betting scandals in IPL cricket in Mumbai. Prithvi then reveals that Kamal faked his death in a secret mission to draw attention to the betting scandals and returns under the name Praveen Kumar. Arumuga Chettiyar, an influential illegal business dealer and Faizal's boss, owns "Golden Theatres" in Mumbai, which has been converted into a gambling den and forms the front for all his illegal businesses.

Vinayak is introduced to Chettiyar through his girlfriend Sanjana. Sanjana is in love with Vinayak, but he pretends to love her. Sumanth, a goon working for Chettiyar, hatches a conspiracy to rob the money in the company of his friends: Ganesh, a local Sub-Inspector; Mahat, who owns a bar in Mumbai; and Mahat's friend Prem, an IIT graduate. Vinayak befriends the boys at Sumanth's marriage with Suchithra. One late evening, Vinayak meets Prem, who becomes inebriated by him and reveals their heist plan. Vinayak starts spying on them and confronts them on the day of the planned heist, stepping in. The four take him in, promising him a fifth of the share. Vinayak has other plans. He wants to kill his accomplices and take the entire amount. He promises to help them and divide it between them. After looting the money, they leave the money in an abandoned godown. 

Later, all of them celebrate the turn of events at Mahat's bar, but Sumanth is identified at the party by Faizal and is later caught by him. Sumanth is cornered by Chettiyar, who orders Faizal to kill him for his treachery, but is rescued in time by Ganesh and Vinayak, and the trio escape from the hideout, taking Chettiyar hostage. While driving back to the godown, Vinayak finds Sanjana on the way and brutally shoves Chettiyar out of the vehicle in front of her. Sanjana engulfs in grief when she learns of Vinayak's true intentions. Upon reaching the godown, they discover that Mahat and Prem had escaped with the cash and are accompanied by Sona. The three are then confronted by Faizal and Chettiyar's men, but manage to evade them and get on the run. Sumanth later turns against Vinayak when he discovers that his wife had been kidnapped by Chettiyar. 

After a brief scuffle, Sumanth runs into Prithvi, who takes him to custody and rescues his wife on the condition that he turns approver and divulge everything. He is killed when Prithvi's wife Sabitha is kidnapped and threatened by Vinayak. Vinayak learns of Mahat and Prem's whereabouts through Ganesh, and along with him, starts pursuing them. Prithvi and the others follow suit, and all of them are holed up in a highway resort with the money. A sequence of events lead to the murders of the gang members one by one — Mahat is killed by Sona, who gets killed by Vinayak and Prem gets killed by Prithvi — with Ganesh and Vinayak remaining alive. A final fight ensues between Vinayak and Prithvi. At the final moment of the fight, Praveen throws a gun at Prithvi, who shoots Vinayak, and a huge explosion rocks the shack, seemingly ending the fight. 

After several days, the police gets information about Ganesh to be living in Thailand. Praveen arrives there but comes across Vinayak. Praveen confronts him and calls up Prithvi to inform him of Vinayak's presence, but it is revealed that Prithvi and Vinayak are best friends since their college days and took police training together. They had come to know about the betting money scheme by Chettiyar and operated the plan together (including Vinayak's faked death). Prithvi informs Vinayak that their money is safe in the Bank of England and asks him to deal with Praveen. Vinayak snatches Praveen's gun and holds him at gunpoint, saying "Game over".

Cast 

 Ajith Kumar as ACP Vinayak Mahadev, I.P.S.
 Arjun Sarja as ACP Prithviraj, leader of the Special Squad formed to track down the IPL Bookies
 Trisha Krishnan as Sanjana Chettiyar
 Lakshmi Rai as Sona
 Anjali as Suchitra Sumanth
 Andrea Jeremiah as Sabitha Prithviraj
 Vaibhav Reddy as Sumanth
 Ashwin Kakumanu as Ganesh, SI of Dharavi
 Premji Amaren as Prem, a professional hacker
 Mahat Raghavendra as Mahat, a leisure bar owner
 Jayaprakash as Arumuga Chettiyar, a business dealer who owns "Golden Theatres"
 Aravind Akash as Faizal, Chettiyaar's goon
 Subbu Panchu as Kamal Ekambaram/Praveen Kumar
 Ravikanth as Chettiyar's assistant
 Boys Rajan as Special Squad officer
 Vinay Forrt as Sriharan
 Chemban Vinod Jose as Dr Hitler
 Assim Jamal as Karthik
 Ramya Subramanian as Reporter (special appearance)
 Vijay Vasanth in a cameo appearance as the wine shop owner
 Debi Dutta as an item number "Machi, Open The Bottle"
 Kainaat Arora as an item number "Machi, Open The Bottle"
 Rachel White in a special appearance
 Dipali Singh in a special appearance
 Sakthi Saravanan in a special appearance
 Venkat Prabhu in a special appearance (uncredited cameo)
 Ramesh Thilak as Arumuga Chettiyar's henchman (uncredited role)

Production

Development 
Following the release of his film Aasal in February 2010, Ajith Kumar was signed by Dhayanidhi Alagiri's Cloud Nine Movies for a project touted to be directed by Gautham Vasudev Menon. However, as Ajith participated in the 2010 season of the FIA Formula Two Championship, Gautham Vasudev Menon, unwilling to wait, decided to shelve the film and opted to focus on another project, which prompted Venkat Prabhu, who was keen on making a multi-starrer film featuring top stars, to sign the actor in his next film, after the director saw moderate success with his previous film, Goa. Prabhu had written three scripts, out of which the actor chose Mankatha, in which he would portray a character "with grey shades". Venkat Prabhu later disclosed that Ajith was never considered for the role when he wrote the first draft of the script but that he kept his "usual gang of boys in mind" while creating the characters. Vaibhav Reddy suggested that a "big hero" should play the protagonist, with actor Vivek Oberoi and Sathyaraj being considered first for the role. Ajith had called Prabhu at that time and expressed interest in performing a role similar to The Joker character played by Heath Ledger in the 2008 American superhero film The Dark Knight. With the protagonist role in Mankatha incidentally being such a character, Ajith immediately accepted the role, turning the film into a high-profile production.  Prabhu further emphasised that the script had been altered due to Ajith's entry and he had incorporated "certain elements" that Ajith's fans would expect in a film and also said that "I approached Mankatha as a fan and asked myself how I would want to see Ajith sir on screen and then set out".

Pre-production
The film officially commenced on 2 August 2010 with the formal launch and a simple pooja held at the AVM Studios, Chennai, coinciding with Ajith's 18th anniversary of his entry into the film industry. The film's title, initially being Mangaatha, derived from a popular Indian traditional card game, underwent a minor change in its spelling, due to numerological reasons. During the pre-production stage, while Prabhu was still working on the scriptment, sources claimed the film to be on the lines of Steven Soderbergh's heist film Ocean Eleven (2001). The story was later reported to revolve around a Mafia gang gambling during the Indian Premier League (IPL) cricket season. In June 2011, reports emerged that the film was a remake of the 2008 Hindi film Jannat that was based on match fixing. However, Dhayanidhi and Venkat Prabhu quickly denied the news and assured that Mankatha was original. Upon completion of filming, Prabhu named it "his favourite film so far" and "close to my heart".

Casting 
The film was supposed to be a "multi-starrer", with several leading Indian actors expected to appear in it, which is a rare occurrence and would be the first of its kind in the Tamil film industry. Telugu actor Nagarjuna was first approached to essay a powerful character as a CBI officer, being initially confirmed by the director during the launch of the film. He had also conveyed interest in remaking the film into Telugu and playing Ajith's role in return, but since he could not adjust his call sheet, he was forced to pull out, with Arjun replacing him in November 2010. In an interview from August 2010, Venkat Prabhu had affirmed that Mohan Babu's son, Manoj Manchu, Ganesh Venkatraman, Venkat Prabhu's younger brother, Premji Amaren, who had been part of all his brothers' films, and a newcomer Mahat Raghavendra, a childhood friend of producer Dhayanidhi Alagiri, were signed to portray Ajith's sidekicks in the film. However, Manoj Manchu couldn't accept the offer due to a shoulder injury and was eventually replaced by Vaibhav Reddy, appearing in the third consecutive Venkat Prabhu film, while in December 2010, sources revealed that another newcomer Ashwin Kakumanu, who previously was seen in Nadunisi Naaygal, was roped in for the fourth role, replacing Ganesh Venkatraman. Nandha Durairaj later stated that he was offered the role as well, but had to reject it since he was busy shooting for Vellore Maavattam. Prasanna was also considered for the film only to reject due to busy schedules. Jai in 2013 revealed that he was initially roped in to play the police officer role but that Venkat Prabhu replaced him with Arjun after Ajith became part of the project.

Prabhu termed the film as "male-oriented", attaching less importance and significance to the female characters in the film. Early reports suggested that Samantha Ruth Prabhu, Kajal Aggarwal and Anushka Shetty were initially approached for the lead female roles, while in July 2010, reports surfaced that Shriya Saran and Neetu Chandra, and Lakshmi Rai were supposedly signed for the roles. However, the following month Neetu Chandra opted out of the film, refusing the project due to unavailability of dates. Subsequently, Trisha was signed to portray Sanjana, Ajith's love interest, pairing with him for the third time, with Lakshmi Rai being confirmed later, who was signed on to play an important and "lengthy role". Venkat Prabhu revealed that changes in the script resulted in changes of the female characters' personalities, clarifiying that Trisha was not the replacement for Neetu Chandra and that the characters offered to both were different, while adding that Trisha's role was specifically written for her. Prabhu further stated that Lakshmi Rai was first chosen to play Ashwin's pair, which was dropped when the screenplay was altered, and that she was eventually offered the role of Sona, resolving that Rai was not given a choice to select between the roles of Sanjana and Sona, as the actress had claimed post the film's release. Earlier, reports had claimed that model and actress Jacqueline Fernandez was also roped in for a guest role. In November 2010, Sneha was reported to be added to the cast to be paired opposite Arjun, however the role was later finalised with Andrea Jeremiah portraying that character. She was also expected to perform a song for the soundtrack album.

Other additions to the cast in the following months included Subbu Panchu, who rose to fame with his appearance in Boss Engira Bhaskaran and would essay a police officer character, Jayaprakash, enacting also a character with negative shades as the father of Trisha's character, and Anjali, playing Vaibhav's pair. Sources claimed that Venkat Prabhu himself would also enact a pivotal role in the film, while reports suggesting that Vijay would appear in a cameo role were dismissed by the producer, who clarified that Vijay Vasanth would appear in a pivotal role. Concerning the film crew, Venkat Prabhu renewed his previous associations with his cousin Yuvan Shankar Raja, for the background score and soundtrack of Mankatha, Sakthi Saravanan, who would handle the cinematography, and Praveen K. L., who along with N. B. Srikanth, would take care of the editing. Vasuki Bhaskar and Kalyan remained the costume designer and the main choreographer, respectively, with Shoby joining the latter for a couple of songs, while Selva was assigned as the stunt coordinator.

Filming 
The film was launched on 2 August 2010 at AVM Studios in Vadapalani, Chennai in a simple manner, following which the film's shooting commenced with the principal photography. The first schedule of filming was supposed to begin by early September, but due to pre-production works and since the principal cast was not decided yet, the shooting got delayed further, finally commencing on 25 October in Chennai. Several days earlier, a test shoot was conducted with Premji Amaren, Mahat Raghavendra and Vaibhav Reddy taking part in it. Following shoots, involving Ajith, Trisha and Premji, along the Rajiv Gandhi Salai (OMR), and at Ajith's home, a duet song, picturized on Ajith and Trisha, featuring CGI special effects, was filmed in early November, in a Chennai studio nearby the East Coast Road. From 10 November onwards, the "introduction" song was shot for five days in Bangkok, Thailand, with Ajith, Lakshmi Rai and some foreigners participating.

The film's second schedule was planned to begin on 6 December 2010 in a studio in Chennai, which was slightly delayed due to heavy rain, and started couple of days later. This led to speculation that the film had been shelved due to financial constraints, which was quickly denied by Venkat Prabhu. During the schedule, all important stunt sequences were canned at Binny Mills in Perambur, while simultaneously a grand set, resembling the Dharavi slum in Mumbai was erected in a Chennai studio. Ajith also performed one of the action choreographies with the use of a body mounted camera, weighing around 30 kg. In late December, the third song, a "high-spirited peppy number", was shot for five days, with Shobi choreographing the steps. An item number, titled "Machi, Open The Bottle", it featured actresses Debi Dutta and Kainaat Arora dancing to the song along with Ajith and the rest of the gang The schedule was wrapped up by early February, with which approximately fifty per cent of the film was reportedly completed.

The remaining part of the film was supposedly to be shot during the third and last schedule to be held in Mumbai, which was to start in late February. However, sourced clarified that the subsequent schedule, too, would be held in Chennai only, with filming being carried on at the Padmanabha Theatre in North Chennai. In late March, the crew eventually moved to Mumbai, where the filming was held for nearly two weeks, mostly at the Dharavi slum. The climax portion was planned to be filmed at Madurai, which was considered as "apt" for the "action-oriented" sequence, but was eventually filmed in Chennai as well, while the remaining scenes were to be canned in Hyderabad. During the first week of June, Ajith had reportedly completed his portion, with his last day shoot being held in Hyderabad, while sources confirmed that filming was still being carried on later that month in Hyderabad. Shooting was further extended, with the crew leaving for Bangkok again in late June for a ten-day schedule to shoot the pending scenes, including a lengthy fight sequence and a song, involving Premji and Lakshmi Rai. Despite earlier announcement that Ajith had finished his portions, a "special scene" featuring Ajith in a different look was filmed on one day during the first week of July. Principal photography ended by June 2011.

Post-production
Mankatha'''s post-production works commenced by mid-June 2011, and were carried on for over one month. Earlier, an animation sequence lasting about 4 minutes was being created by specialised technicians, while CGI special effects were included in a song and action scenes, which was cited as the reason for the delay. By early August, all actors but Ajith had finished dubbing for their characters, including Trisha who on Venkat Prabhu insistence spoke dubbing for herself in the film, which became only the third film to feature her original voice. Rekhs, who had previously subtitled films including Enthiran and Vinnaithaandi Varuvaayaa, subtitled Mankatha during the first week of August, while Yuvan Shankar Raja worked on the re-recording, being assisted by Premji.

Music

The film score and soundtrack of Mankatha were composed by Yuvan Shankar Raja, becoming his fourth collaboration with Venkat Prabhu and Ajith as well. The soundtrack, consists of eight tracks, including one Theme music track and one club mix, with lyrics penned by Vaali, and Gangai Amaran and renowned poet Subramanya Bharathi's grandson, Niranjan Bharathi.Itsy Bitsy . The Hindu (6 August 2011). Retrieved 1 June 2015. As earlier done in Saroja and Goa, a promotional track too was planned, which however did not materialise in last minute. Prior to the official soundtrack launch, a single track, "Vilaiyaadu Mankatha", was released in mid-May 2011. The music rights were secured by Sony Music who had reportedly offered  10 million. The soundtrack album, following several postponements, was released on 10 August 2011 at Radio Mirchi's Chennai station, while two days later the team arranged a press meet, showcasing two songs and the trailer of the film. The album was reported to have achieved record breaking sales. The songs received mixed response, with their placements in the film being criticised, while the film's score was widely appreciated.

 Marketing 
Even before beginning the principal photography, a short teaser trailer was shot on the day of the launch itself, since it coincided with Aadi Perukku and was considered an auspicious day. The first teaser was screened along with the film Naan Mahaan Alla, another Cloud Nine Movies distribution that released on 20 August 2010. During Diwali 2010, the first look posters of Mankatha were published in newspapers. A teaser featuring the song "Vilaiyaadu Mankatha" was released on Ajith's birthday, on 1 May 2011 on YouTube, after plans of releasing the film or the soundtrack on that day had failed. As the teaser garnered high response, the song was released as a single track on 20 May 2011, creating positive media response. Mankatha merchandise were launched for sale after the 50th day. Items included exclusive sun glasses, t-shirts, hand cuffs, and pendants etc.:- all on a limited edition basis.

 Release Mankatha was given a U/A certificate by the Censor Board after 10 cuts. Prior to submitting the film for certification, the makers themselves bleeped profane words. One week later, the British Board of Film Classification issued a 15 certificate with an advice that it "contains strong threat and violence". Later, the distributor reduced violence in three reels and secured a 12A classification for theatrical release. During the late production stage, reports indicated that Mankatha faced "political pressure" following the change in government after the 2011 Tamil Nadu Legislative Assembly election, with sources claiming that the film did not find any buyers in Tamil Nadu, since it was produced by the grandson of DMK president M. Karunanidhi. Cloud Nine Movies began negotiations with other production houses to sell the domestical theatrical rights, however talks with UTV Motion Pictures and Gemini Film Circuit resulted in failure. On 22 August 2011, Gnanavelraja confirmed that his production house Studio Green, had purchased the Indian domestic theatrical and the television rights of the film at an undisclosed record amount.

However, in a turn of events, Studio Green cancelled the deal the very next day due to "various reasons" which Gnanavel Raja did not want to elaborate, in spite of posters in newspapers featuring Studio Green's logo. Times of India reported that Azhagiri bought back the rights, since Gnanavel Raja had planned to sell the satellite rights to Jaya TV, a channel run by the opposition party, AIADMK. On 24 August, Azhagiri announced that Kalanidhi Maran's Sun Pictures had bought the theatrical and satellite rights of the film and would distribute it along with Cloud Nine Movies. Udhayanidhi Stalin was said to have negotiated the deal and united the production houses to release the film jointly. Mankatha thus became the first Ajith film under Sun Pictures banner as well as their first release after the assembly election. Actress Raadhika's Radaan Mediaworks distributed the film to Tamil Nadu theatres.

Dhayanidhi Azhagiri announced that the film would be a worldwide release with subtitles in English, simultaneously opening across Singapore, Malaysia, Sri Lanka, United Kingdom, the United States, Australia, Canada and many other parts of Middle East and Europe. The film was also dubbed into Telugu as Gambler and released in Andhra Pradesh on 9 September 2011. Noted Telugu producer Bellamkonda Suresh acquired the film's Telugu dubbing rights by late August 2011 and released the Telugu dubbed version across 225 screens, enabling the biggest opening for a dubbed version of a Tamil film. Ten days later, the film was a box-office hit in Kerala as well.  The film became scheduled for a release on 1 September 2011 in order to cash in on the Vinayaka Chaturthi-Ramadan weekend, before Ayngaran International eventually finalised 31 August 2011 as the release date in overseas theatres few days later. In the United States, the film was released at 34 theatres.

 Reception 
Box officeMankatha released in about 1,000 screens worldwide and the film had a solo opening in Tamil Nadu on 31 August. It was said to have collected 25.2 crore nett from 370 screens in Tamil Nadu during the opening five-day weekend, and around 30 crore nett in its first week. The film became the biggest grosser of the year as well as that of Ajith's career, while also garnering the second-highest opening after Enthiran (2010). In Chennai city alone, the film earned 2.72 crore in the first weekend from 19 screens. The multiplexes gave it the maximum number of shows including morning shows in all screens. Mankatha recovered its cost of production in 2 weeks, making it the fastest film in recent times to turn profitable.

At the Mayajaal multiplex, Mankatha was screened in all 14 screens on the first day, resulting in 70 shows per day, all being sold out, while Sathyam Cinemas reported a net of 0.34 crore from two screens for the five-day weekend. The film grossed 6.5 crore in 19 days in Chennai. The Telugu version Gambler, which released in 225 screens. In Kerala, the film was released in the original language in Thiruvananthapuram and Palakkad districts on 31 August while a dubbed version released all over the state on 9 September, opening at first rank, outclassing other Malayalam releases. The film bought for 0.6 crore in Kerala was expected to get distributor share of 1.4 crore. The Telugu version got high opening compared to other mainstream films It was successful at the Bangalore box office.

The film opened at second rank in Malaysia, grossing $803,666 in its first weekend, with a per screen average of $19,602 (highest per screen average) claiming the second-highest opening weekend for a Tamil film. After four weeks, the film grossed 0.6 crore in Malaysia. In the United Kingdom, the film grossed $179,054 from 16 screens, opening at No.1 spot and No.4 in the all-time chartMankatha enters all-time 15 chart . Moviecrow.com. Retrieved 17 December 2013. Overall the film grossed $1,104,911 in Malaysia in six weeks, and $268,533 in UK at the end of the third week. Sun Pictures, the distributors declared that Mankatha grossed 80 crore worldwide in thirty days, nearing the end of its run. Sify termed the film as a blockbuster as well as the year's biggest commercial success. The film completed a 50-day run at the box office and was ranked as second highest grosser in Tamil cinema behind Enthiran at the time of its release.Mankatha enters All-time chart . Moviecrow.com. Retrieved 17 December 2013. According to The Times of India, the film grossed ₹100 crore at the worldwide box office in its final run. However, Madras Musings stated that the film made only 68 crore in its lifetime.

Critical responseMankatha received generally positive reviews with critics lauding Ajith's performance. Malathi Rangarajan of The Hindu called it a "gutsy" and "engaging game of cat and mouse that springs no surprises", adding that Venkat Prabhu had "laid out a filling spread this time". Anupama Subramanian of the Deccan Chronicle rated it 3 out of 5 as well, claiming that Ajith "sparkles in his 50th film".  N Venkateswaran of The Times of India rated the film 4 out of 5, saying "Ajith is the soul of the movie and the others have nothing much to do, with the exception of Arjun." and called it "a good watch, especially because of Ajith's baddie act." S. Viswanath of Deccan Herald said, "Mankatha is strictly for Ajith fans, who has a wholesome blast, puffing, bulldozing his way and bedding belles by the dozen like there is no tomorrow."  Pavithra Srinivasan of Rediff rated the film 2.5 out of 5 stars, saying "If Mankatha works even just a bit, it's because of Ajith, whose charisma shines through. Watch it only for him. The rest really don't matter." Sifys critic highlighted that Ajith "steals the thunder and plays the emotionless bad man, to perfection", further adding that he looked "smashing and his scorching screen presence is unmatchable", while the reviewer criticised the script as being "dull", and concluded "for die-hard fans of Ajith who don't have a problem with an unforgivable 2 hours 40 minutes running time and juvenile comedy, this might be a treat. For others though, it's strictly average entertainment." Akhila Krishnamurthy of Outlook said, "The thing about testosterone is it can either excite or frustrate. There is no in-between. Tamil superstar Ajith's much-anticipated 50th film is a very "male film", no doubt. There's a heist, a few chases, gunfights, cusswords, three good-looking women and a salt-and-pepper-haired protagonist, who is naughty at forty. Only, none of it excites."

Accolades

 Legacy 
Google Zeitgeist 2011, a compilation of the year's most frequent search queries, placed Mankatha at 7th rank, becoming the only Tamil film to secure a place in the list. Sudhish Kamath of The Hindu included Mankatha in his list "Year of Anti-Hero" stating that "Mankatha earns its place here simply because it took a fairly dark genre like noir and celebrated evil minus the darkness" and also went to write that "this comic heist film is the best thing Ajith has ever done since Billa". Ajith's appearance, dubbed the "salt-and-pepper look", was widely praised, leading to him reusing the same appearance in most of his subsequent films. This look eventually became a trendsetter for Tamil heroes.

The verse "Aadama Jaichomada" from "Machi Open The Bottle" inspired a film of the same name. The scene where Vinayak gets excited by the collection of money was parodied in Tamizh Padam 2'' (2018).

Possible sequel 
Shortly after the film's release and its high commercial success, Venkat Prabhu confirmed the possibility of a sequel, provided that Ajith Kumar accepted. Sources also reported that Prabhu planned to use the initial script that he had penned before Ajith became part of the film. In November 2013, Dhayanidhi said, "That people are still talking about Mankatha 2 shows the grand victory that Mankatha achieved when it released. People can't forget such a movie and I want to make sure that 'Brand Mankatha' stays on in people's minds. The sequel might happen in future but we haven't started any discussions in this regard. The good news is that Venkat Prabhu has already readied the plot for the sequel.

Remake 
A Hindi remake of the film has been confirmed by Gnanavel Raja of Studio Green. The cast and crew are yet to be finalised.

Notes

References

External links 
 
 
 
 

2010s chase films
2010s Tamil-language films
2011 films
Fictional portrayals of the Maharashtra Police
Films directed by Venkat Prabhu
Films scored by Yuvan Shankar Raja
Films set in Mumbai
Films shot in Andhra Pradesh
Films shot in Bangalore
Films shot in Bangkok
Films shot in Hyderabad, India
Films shot in Karnataka
Films shot in Maharashtra
Films shot in Mumbai
Indian chase films
Indian films about gambling
Indian heist films
Indian crime action films
2011 crime action films